Nephele subvaria is a species of moth in the  family Sphingidae.

Distribution 
It is known from Queensland and Western Australia.

Description 

The wingspan is about 60 mm. The forewings are brown and the hindwings may be either brown or red.

Biology 
The larvae feed on Carissa spinarum. They are grey with a strong horn on the tail and some white diagonal stripes on the sides.

References

Nephele (moth)
Moths described in 1856